Jaani Dushman: Ek Anokhi Kahaani is a 2002 Indian Hindi-language action thriller film directed and produced by Rajkumar Kohli, making it his last film as a director. The film features an ensemble cast; including Sunny Deol, Akshay Kumar, Sunil Shetty, and Manisha Koirala and Armaan Kohli as the main antagonists, along  e.

The film was Armaan Kohli's comeback film where he was reintroduced with a new name Munish Kohli. The movie received extremely negative reviews and was a disaster at the box office. It is also considered one of the worst films ever made. However, over the years, the film has achieved cult status.

Plot
  
Divya (Manisha Koirala) and Karan Saxena (Sunny Deol) are in love and engaged. Karan has a younger step-brother, Vivek (Sonu Nigam), whom he looks after as if he was his own brother. Divya and Vivek study in the same college with their best- friends group. The group includes:

 Atul Agarwal (Akshay Kumar), who is dating Nita (Rambha) and is an atheist, Leader of Their Group
 Bodybuilder and boxer Vijay (Sunil Shetty), who is dating Preeti (Pinky Campbell).
 Vivek Saxena (Sonu Nigam), Atul's best friend and Karan's brother.
 Ashok Kejriwal (Aditya Pancholi), an extremely wealthy man who is dating Rashmi (Kiran Rathod)
 Prem Srivastava (Aftab Shivdasani), who is secretly in love with Rashmi.
 Victor (Sharad Kapoor), a photographer.
 Abdul (Arshad Warsi), who is always looking to crack a joke.
 Rajesh (Rajat Bedi), a womanizer who always lusts for Divya. 
 Divya/Vasundhara, the most beautiful girl in the college.

Two students named Rajesh and Madan (Sushant 'Siddharth' Ray) attempt to rape Divya. They are stopped and beaten up by Karan, who takes them to the college's principal, Professor Joseph. He agrees to let the incident go if Divya forgives them, which she later does. However, Rajesh and Madan decide to avenge their humiliation. Soon after, Karan goes to London for work. Divya then begins to have premonitions of a past life and later learns that her name was Vasundhara in a past life, and she was in love with Kapil (Armaan Kohli), a snake with magical powers. Their love life was shattered when they disturbed an angry sage (Amrish Puri) who cursed them with separation until the 21st century. Kapil had to undergo a penance until the 21st century when Vasundhara will be reborn as Divya. He also gained supernatural strength, near-immortality, and the power to impersonate anything as a result of his penance.

Under the pretext of inviting Divya to Atul's party, Rajesh imitates the voices of all the guys in the group and tricks her into coming to an abandoned fort earlier than the scheduled time for the party. Divya arrives, where she is brutally raped by Rajesh and Madan, prompting her to kill herself. Divya's friends arrive, and she curses them, thinking that they were involved in the rape. Kapil learns of her death and promises to get his revenge on everyone in the group. As a result, Madan is killed the same night by Kapil. Divya is meanwhile reduced to a soul, who could enter human bodies and control them as per her wish. Rajesh gets married and his best friends arrive at the party. On that night, she enters the soul of his bride and kills him.

Kapil and Divya decide to kill everyone (everyone whose voice Rajesh had imitated) who coerced her to go to the fort. Kapil impersonates a driver who gives a lift to Victor when his car broke down. After isolating him, Kapil runs over Victor with a motorbike. He goes to the party in Lonavala impersonating Victor and kills Abdul by electrocuting him. 

Atul and his friends, with the help of their Principal Joseph (Raj Babbar), a professor of parapsychology, summon Divya's ghost. They try to reason with Divya, explaining that they had never called her to the fort after she initially declined. However, she refuses to believe their innocence. The principal gives the group necklaces with higher powers and assures them that they cannot be harmed by supernatural forces when they are wearing the necklace. Atul, an atheist, doesn't believe this. However, when he is attacked by Kapil, he realizes he survived because the necklace was stuck on his hand. Later, Kapil impersonates Nita and badly injures Atul but couldn't kill him. He ends up in a coma.

Divya then enters Prem's body and kills his nemesis Ashok. Prem is immediately arrested but could be set free based on Rashmi's false statement, which she is willing to give because she was also in love with Prem. However, Divya enters Rashmi's body and accuses Prem of the murder in court. A distraught Prem is sentenced to be hanged to death by the court.

Preeti's father wants her to marry his friend's boxer son Raju instead of Vijay. Her father and Raju collude and decide that Raju will kill Vijay in a boxing match to remove him from the picture. Divya enters Raju's body and almost knocks out Vijay. But the principal notices this and uses his paraphernalia to block Divya's presence. Divya doesn't let Kapil interfere, and Vijay knocks out Raju. Divya stopped Kapil as she wants to be the one killing Vijay since he was the one who informed her of the time to arrive at the fort that night. She exacts her revenge by entering Vijay's body, who jumps off the terrace and dies.

The death of all his friends scares Vivek, who calls Karan to return to Mumbai to protect him. Before Karan could arrive home, Kapil impersonates him and stabs Vivek, but couldn't kill him. Kapil escapes and a confused Karan is arrested after Vivek accuses him of the stabbing. Atul comes out of a coma and escapes the hospital with Vivek, who also recovered at the same hospital to kill Kapil. Atul is stabbed by Kapil while trying to save Vivek. Kapil then goes after Vivek. Atul, unable to destroy Kapil or save Vivek's life, goes to the principal and begs him to save Vivek's life. Atul then dies due to blood loss from his injuries.

Karan breaks out of the police lockup and shows up to stop Kapil from killing Vivek. Karan is fatally wounded by Kapil. Principal Joseph resurrects Karan with outer-world powers, granting him supernatural powers like Kapil. Karan finally kills Kapil. Vivek and Karan survive with Vivek being the only survivor among his best friends. Kapil and Vasundhara reunite in heaven.

Cast
Sunny Deol as Karan Saxena, Vivek's elder brother.
Suniel Shetty as Vijay
Akshay Kumar as Atul Agarwal
Aditya Pancholi as Ashok Kejriwal 
Arshad Warsi as Abdul
Manisha Koirala as Divya / Vasundhara Snake Woman 
Armaan Kohli as Kapil Snake Man
Sharad Kapoor as Victor
Sonu Nigam as Vivek Saxena / Vicky, Karan's younger brother.
Aftab Shivdasani as Prem Srivastava 
Siddharth Ray as Madan The Goon Negative role
Rajat Bedi as Rajesh The Goon Negative role
Rambha as Nita, Atul's girlfriend.
Kiran Rathod as Rashmi Sharma
Raj Babbar as Principal Joseph
Kiran Kumar as a Police Inspector
Raza Murad as Priti's father (special appearance)
Shahbaaz Khan as Raju (cameo appearance)                                                                                                           
Jaspal Bhatti as Raju's Boxing manager (cameo appearance)
Aman Verma as TV show host
Shamsuddin as Javed in song Javed Bhai So Re Le.
Upasana Singh as Niki
Ali Khan as Doctor
Pinky Campbell as Priti
Gavin Packard as Referee
Amrish Puri as Sadhu (special appearance)
Atul Agnihotri as a man driving in red car. (cameo appearance)
Dinesh Hingoo as a man in a car with his family. (cameo appearance)
Preeti Bhutani
Johnny Lever as Parwana

Production
Salman Khan was the original choice for Sonu Nigam's role but declined the film because of date issues. Atul Agnihotri was initially signed for Sharad Kapoor's role in the film but later opted for a guest appearance, then the role went to Apurva Agnihotri but declined it due to date issues. Shah Rukh Khan was originally chosen to play Akshay Kumar's role but declined it because he was busy filming Kal Ho Naa Ho (2003) in New York City. Chandrachur Singh was first signed to play Aditya Pancholi's role but then he opted out. Shilpa Shetty was  considered to play Manisha Koirala's role, but she declined the role. At one point when the film was announced, Ajay Devgn was supposed to play Suniel Shetty's role, Sanjay Dutt was going to be an extra character similar to his father Sunil Dutt's role in Nagin (1976) and Jackie Shroff playing Raj Babbar's role.

A star-studded cast was initially planned for this film featuring Sunny Deol, Shah Rukh Khan, Salman Khan, Ajay Devgn, Sanjay Dutt, Jackie Shroff, Chandrachur Singh, Apurva Agnihotri, Aftab Shivdasani, Arshad Warsi, Shilpa Shetty and Armaan Kohli but then the cast subsequently changed and it later starred Sunny Deol, Akshay Kumar, Suniel Shetty, Chandrachur Singh, Aftab Shivdasani, Arshad Warsi, Atul Agnihotri, Shilpa Shetty and Armaan Kohli. The film's theme was initially similar to that of Kohli's previous venture Nagin (1976) at that time, and the heroes were playing young mature men instead of college students later cast subsequently changed to Sunny Deol, Akshay Kumar, Sonu Nigam, Suniel Shetty, Aftab Shivdasani, Aditya Pancholi, Arshad Warsi, Sharad Kapoor, Manisha Koirala and Armaan Kohli in the lead role with a different subject.

Reception

Critical response
This film received highly negative reviews from critics. Ranjita Kulkarni of Rediff.com rated the film 1.5/10 saying, "The performances are half-hearted and the characters half-baked". He also called the film "unoriginal and disappointing". Akshay Kumar was the only one with a watchable performance and the star of the film,  Sunil Shetty was barely average & Sunny Deol was wasted in this movie because he did fewer scenes than in his previous movies.
Bollywood Hungama rated the film 1.5/5, stating, "The film has a huge cast, but only Sunny Deol and Akshay Kumar leave an impact. Munish "Armaan" Kohli & others don't impress much".The film's VFX is even considered one of the worst VFX even today. Planet Bollywood rated the film 5/10, saying "In terms of a story, writers Aatish and Kohli have just churned out a mish-mash of the previous two hits. The reason why Manisha blames all her friends for her death seems lame, hence the film fails to hold together or have any sort of lasting impact. Also, the story of "Ichadari Naag" etc is a bit hard to digest in this day and age. The screenplay of the movie is pathetic. A lot of the scenes in the movie evoke laughter where they shouldn't. Just take for example how Akshay Kumar and Sonu Nigam don´t die and keep coming back for more. After the worst form of stabbings and bashings, they seem to look almost healthy in the next scene. Dialogues by K.K Singh are disappointing."

Box Office

Jaani Dushman: Ek Anokhi Kahaani opened well at the box office, collecting about ₹13.5 million on its first day. It collected ₹14 million on its second day and ₹12.7 million on its third day, taking its opening weekend collection to ₹40.2 million.

However, the negative critical reception led to a drastic fall in the box office collection. Its first-week collection closed at ₹64.7 million. Its collection continued declining, and finally ended up at a domestic nett of ₹107.1 million, resulting in the film being declared as a "Flop" by Box Office India.

Soundtrack
The music for Jaani Dushman: Ek Anokhi Kahani was composed by Anand Raj Anand & Anand–Milind, with a guest composition by Sandeep Chowta. It was released on Universal Music. All tracks composed by Anand–Milind had lyrics penned by Sameer, whereas the tracks composed by Anand Raj Anand had lyrics written by Dev Kohli.

References

External links

2002 films
2000s Hindi-language films
Indian fantasy action films
Indian supernatural thriller films
Indian action thriller films
Films about shapeshifting
2000s fantasy action films
Films scored by Anand–Milind
Films scored by Anand Raj Anand
Films scored by Sandeep Chowta
2002 action thriller films
2000s supernatural thriller films
Films about snakes
Indian slasher films
Indian dark fantasy films